Słobódka may refer to the following places:
Słobódka, Hajnówka County in Podlaskie Voivodeship (north-east Poland)
Słobódka, Sokółka County in Podlaskie Voivodeship (north-east Poland)
Słobódka, Suwałki County in Podlaskie Voivodeship (north-east Poland)